Zoran Kačić (born 9 September 1953) is a Croatian water polo player. He competed in the men's tournament at the 1976 Summer Olympics.

See also
 Yugoslavia men's Olympic water polo team records and statistics
 List of men's Olympic water polo tournament goalkeepers

References

External links
 

1953 births
Living people
Water polo players from Split, Croatia
Croatian male water polo players
Water polo goalkeepers
Olympic water polo players of Yugoslavia
Water polo players at the 1976 Summer Olympics